Poh Ling Yeow (born 1973) is a Malaysian-born Australian cook, artist, actress, author and television presenter.

Early life and history 
Born in Kuala Lumpur, Malaysia, into a fifth-generation Malaysian Chinese family, and her mother is of Hakka descent. Yeow attended SMK Convent Bukit Nanas. She immigrated to Australia at age 9 with her parents and brother, eventually settling in Adelaide, South Australia. After attending Seymour College and then the University of South Australia (where she earned a Bachelor of Design degree), Yeow worked as a freelance graphic designer, illustrator, and makeup artist.

Yeow's corporate clients as a makeup artist included L'Oréal and Attitude magazine, the Australian String Quartet and the short film My Last Ten Hours With You. Her personal clients included Megan Gale and Lisa Ho. Freelance work as a makeup artist led to her preparing models for artist David Bromley, increasing her understanding of the art market. Yeow has acknowledged that she posed as a nude model for Bromley.

Yeow adopted the Western first name Sharon until age 25, but reverted to Poh Ling as a part of embracing her cultural heritage. She became a full-time professional artist in 2002.

Career

Artist 
Yeow works mainly with acrylic paint on canvas. Her early works featured heavily textured backgrounds whereas recent works present a smoother, more refined and highly detailed finish.

Elements of her Chinese heritage feature in her work, including the goldfish, a symbol of prosperity and good luck in Chinese culture, lotus flowers, ponds, and Australian flora and fauna. A recurring character in Yeow's recent work is one that she calls The Girl ("my autobiographical twin"), who she refers to in the third person, although the character's facial features are clearly similar to Yeow's. She says "I guess [The Girl] was developed as a cathartic act, in terms of embracing everything that I did hate about myself physically: the broad nose, the Asian eyes, the broad face".

A further theme behind her recent body of work was Yeow's split with her partner of 10 years, with titles including "Was That the Last Goodbye?" and "You Haven't Left and I Miss You Already". Her Mermaid series, with The Girl's clothes fashioned from goldfish scales and fins, is about losing your identity and taking on your partner's.

In 2003, Yeow donated an artwork to raise funds for breast cancer research at Flinders Medical Centre. She was also a judge for Youthscape 2008.

Exhibitions and media 
From her first solo exhibition in 2002, Yeow has been a regular exhibitor at the Hill Smith Gallery. She has also appeared regularly at Libby Edwards Gallery. Yeow's work has been featured or critically reviewed in publications such as Vogue Australia, House & Garden, The Advertiser and mX.

In 2007, Yeow's artwork was used on the cover of the book The Chinese Exotic by Olivia Khoo. In 2009, Yeow appeared in a glamour shoot for Who magazine.

In 2018, Yeow was the subject of a lengthy radio interview with Richard Fidler on Conversations.

Cook

Beat the Chef 
Yeow first appeared on the ABC television program Beat the Chef on 13 April 2005. Her auntie Kim Thoo assisted her in the studio kitchen, where she prepared Ying Yang Prawns. She returned to the program on 15 June 2005, assisted by her friend Felicity Electricity. This time she prepared Basil Thai Fried Rice
and Deep-Fried Dory Fillets with Green Mango.

MasterChef Australia 
Yeow was selected in the top 20 contestants for the first series of MasterChef Australia from over 7000 applicants. Competition and eliminations began in May 2009. Yeow was eliminated on 18 June 2009 when she incorrectly guessed the ingredients in minestrone. She was one of three eliminated contestants allowed to return to the program on 1 July 2009. She survived further eliminations to compete in the final on 19 July 2009 against Julie Goodwin. Goodwin won the final, with Yeow runner-up.

In 2019, Yeow returned to MasterChef Australia as a mentor, sharing the position with season eight runner-up Matt Sinclair and season seven winner Billie McKay.

In 2020, Yeow returned to MasterChef Australia as a contestant in Back to Win and placed 6th.

World Chef Showcase 
Yeow appeared with Matt Preston in the World Chef Showcase in October 2009.

Poh's Kitchen 
Yeow signed with the Australian Broadcasting Corporation for a cooking series (Poh's Kitchen) and a two-book publishing deal with ABC Books. The production on the series began in November 2009 in her home town of Adelaide. The series was aired from 10 February 2010. Yeow was nominated for the Logie Awards of 2011 in the category of Most Popular New Female Talent.

In 2011, the ABC broadcast a second season of Poh's Kitchen, entitled Poh's Kitchen on the Road. Yeow travelled to all Australian states, as well as Singapore and Thailand, to film stories on produce and cooking. A third season premiered on 11 September 2012.

Poh & Co. 
In 2015, Yeow launched a new series, Poh & Co., on SBS. It features various styles of cooking, and also the renovation of Yeow's backyard.

Jamface by Poh 
Yeow opened a gourmet food stall, Jamface by Poh, at the Adelaide Showground Farmers' Market.

In 2016 Yeow opened a cafe at Adelaide Central Market, also named Jamface by Poh. It closed on 15 October 2019.

Film and television appearances 
Yeow has appeared in four films: Human Touch (2004), Peaches (2004), Hey, Hey, It's Esther Blueburger (2008) and the Tropfest short film Jackie's Spring Palace (2009). She is also credited as production designer on Jackie's Spring Palace.

Aside from her cooking programs, Yeow had substantial roles in Room 101, Can of Worms, Reality Check. She appeared in the 2013 ABC comedy series It's a Date, along with Dave Lawson.

Yeow said "I've always just followed what I've enjoyed doing ... in all areas of creativity."

From 2021, Yeow appeared as one of the hosts of the Australian version of Snackmasters.

From 3 January 2022, Yeow appeared in the eighth season of I'm a Celebrity...Get Me Out of Here!.

In November 2022, Yeow appeared as a celebrity contestant on the 2022 Lego Masters Australia Christmas special.

References

External links 

Personal website
Yeow Family Website and Blog
Poh Ling Yeow at MasterChef Australia

Poh Ling Yeow interview at Australia Network

1973 births
Living people
Australian people of Chinese descent
Malaysian people of Chinese descent
Malaysian emigrants to Australia
People from Adelaide
People from Kuala Lumpur
21st-century Australian actresses
Australian women painters
Australian television chefs
MasterChef Australia
21st-century Australian women artists
21st-century Australian artists
I'm a Celebrity...Get Me Out of Here! (Australian TV series) participants
Australian actresses of Asian descent